Rauenberg is a triangulation station located at  Tempelhof, in the German city of Berlin.

The Monument

The inscription on the East side of the monument is as follows:

Hills of Berlin
Buildings and structures in Tempelhof-Schöneberg
Geodesy